Amydria dyarella is a moth of the family Acrolophidae. It is found in North America, including Alabama, Arkansas, Florida, Indiana, Kentucky, Louisiana, Maryland, Mississippi, North Carolina, Ohio, Texas and West Virginia.

References

Moths described in 1905
Acrolophidae